Kenneth Olayombo (29 August 1947 – 3 July 2013) was a Nigeria international football forward.

Career
Born in Calabar, Olayombo began playing club football for local side Nigerian Army F.C. Olayombo represented Nigeria at the 1968 Summer Olympics in Mexico City. He also made several appearances for the senior Nigeria national team, including five FIFA World Cup qualifying matches. He played at the 1976 African Cup of Nations finals.

References

External links

Kenneth Olayombo's profile at Sports Reference.com

1947 births
2013 deaths
People from Calabar
Nigerian footballers
Nigeria international footballers
Olympic footballers of Nigeria
Footballers at the 1968 Summer Olympics
1976 African Cup of Nations players
African Games gold medalists for Nigeria
African Games medalists in football
Association football forwards
Footballers at the 1973 All-Africa Games